Iosif may refer to:

People
Iosif Amusin, Soviet historian
Iosif Anisim, Romanian sprint canoer 
Iosif Ardeleanu, Romanian communist activist and bureaucrat
Iosif Blaga, Romanian literary theorist and politician 
Iosif Bobulescu, Romanian bishop
Iosif Capotă, Romanian anti-communist resistance fighter 
Iosif Iser, Romanian painter and graphic artist
Iosif Mendelssohn, Romanian chess master
Iosif Pogrebyssky, Ukrainian chess master
Iosif Rotariu, Romanian footballer
Iosif Shklovsky, Soviet astronomer and astrophysicist
Iosif Vitebskiy (born 1938), Soviet Ukrainian Olympic medalist and world champion fencer and fencing coach
Iosif Vigu, Romanian footballer and manager
Iosif Vulcan, Austro-Hungarian Romanian magazine editor and cultural figure
Dan Iosif, Romanian politician
Ștefan Octavian Iosif, Austro-Hungarian and Romanian poet

Places
Iosif, a village in Liebling Commune, Timiș County, Romania

Romanian-language surnames
Romanian masculine given names
Russian masculine given names